Thallium(I) chloride, also known as thallous chloride, is a chemical compound with the formula TlCl. This colourless salt is an intermediate in the isolation of thallium from its ores.  Typically, an acidic solution of thallium(I) sulfate is treated with hydrochloric acid to precipitate insoluble thallium(I) chloride. This solid crystallizes in the caesium chloride motif.

The low solubility of TlCl is exploited in chemical synthesis: treatment of metal chloride complexes with TlPF6, gives the corresponding metal hexafluorophosphate derivative.   The resulting TlCl precipitate is separated by filtration of the reaction mixture.  The overall methodology is similar to the use of AgPF6, except that Tl+ is much less oxidizing.

The crystalline structure is of cubic caesium chloride type at room temperature, but it lowers to the orthorhombic thallium iodide type upon cooling, the transition temperature being likely affected by the impurities. Nanometer-thin TlCl films grown on KBr substrates exhibit a rocksalt structure, while the films deposited on mica or NaCl are of the regular CsCl type.

A very rare mineral lafossaite, is a natural form of thallium(I) chloride.

Thallium(I) chloride, like all thallium compounds, is highly toxic, although its low solubility limits its toxicity.

References

Cited sources

Chlorides
Thallium(I) compounds
Metal halides
Caesium chloride crystal structure